Maxial e Monte Redondo is a civil parish in the municipality of Torres Vedras, Portugal. It was formed in 2013 by the merger of the former parishes Maxial and Monte Redondo. The population in 2011 was 3,546, in an area of 38.39 km². It also contains the village Loubagueira.

References

Freguesias of Torres Vedras